is a multidirectional shooter arcade game designed by Yoshiki Okamoto and released by Konami in 1982. It was distributed in the United States by Centuri, and by Atari Ireland in Europe and the Middle East. While engaging in aerial combat, the player-controlled jet flies across open airspace that scrolls indefinitely in all directions. Each level is themed to a different time period. Home ports for the Atari 2600, MSX, and ColecoVision were released in 1983.

A top-down sequel, Time Pilot '84, was released in arcades in 1984. It drops the time travel motif and instead takes place over a futuristic landscape.

Gameplay

Players assume the role of a pilot of a futuristic fighter jet trying to rescue fellow pilots trapped in different time eras. In each level, players battle enemy aircraft and then a stronger aircraft. Players' fighter jet is in the center of the screen at all times. Players eventually battle a mothership of the time period they are in; once the mothership is defeated, they move onto the next time period. Parachuting pilots will occasionally appear and award players points if collected.

There are five levels: 1910, 1940, 1970, 1982/1983, and 2001. After the fifth level is finished, the game repeats thereafter.

Extra lives are given at 10,000 points, and per 50,000 scored up to 960,000; thereafter, the game goes to "survival of the fittest" mode.

Fighters are destroyed if they collide into bullets, enemy ships, or missiles. Game ends if the last fighter is destroyed.

Development
According to his account, Yoshiki Okamoto's proposal for Time Pilot was initially rejected by his boss at Konami, who assigned Okamoto to work on a driving game instead. Okamoto secretly gave instructions to his programmer to work on his idea, while pretending to be working on a driving game in front of his boss.

Reception 
In Japan, the annual Game Machine chart listed Time Pilot as the fifth highest-grossing arcade video game of 1982. Game Machine later listed Time Pilot on their June 1, 1983 issue as being the eighteenth most popular arcade title of the month.

In the United States, the game topped the Play Meter arcade earnings chart in February 1983. The Amusement & Music Operators Association (AMOA) later listed it among the thirteen highest-earning arcade games of 1983.

Computer and Video Games magazine gave the arcade game a generally favorable review upon release.

Legacy

Re-releases 
 Super Famicom as a Time Pilot '95 bonus game in Ganbare Goemon Kirakira Douchuu: Boku ga Dancer ni Natta Wake.
 PlayStation in Konami Arcade Classics, 1999.
 Game Boy Advance as part of Konami Collector's Series: Arcade Advanced on March 18, 2002. This version includes a hidden sixth era, 1,000,000 BC, with pterodactyls.
 PlayStation 2 as part of the Oretachi Geasen Zoku Sono series in 2005 in Japan.
 Xbox 360 as part of Xbox Live Arcade on August 30, 2006.
 Nintendo DS as part of Konami Classics Series: Arcade Hits.
 i-mode mobile phones in Japan, 2004.
 Nintendo Switch and PlayStation 4 as part of Arcade Archives on 27 May 2021.

Clones
Fury is a 1983 clone from Computer Shack for the TRS-80 Color Computer. Two clones, both called Space Pilot but otherwise unrelated, were released in 1984 and 1986: from Kingsoft for the Commodore 16 and Commodore 64 and Superior Software for the BBC Micro. Vector Pilot is a 2011 hobbyist-written clone for the Vectrex console.

Notes

References

External links
 
 Time Pilot at the Arcade History database
 Time Pilot entry at the Centuri.net Arcade Database

1982 video games
Arcade video games
Atari 2600 games
ColecoVision games
Konami franchises
Konami games
MSX games
Multidirectional shooters
Scrolling shooters
Video games about time travel
Xbox 360 Live Arcade games
Konami arcade games
Video games developed in Japan
Multiplayer and single-player video games